Maynor Alejandro Dávila Reynoso (born 12 February 1982) is a Guatemalan football midfielder who currently plays for Juventud Retalteca of the Guatemalan premier division.

Club career
Dávila started his professional career at army club Aurora and had a spell at Guatemalan giants Comunicaciones. In March 2010, his former club Jalapa were deducted 6 points for breach of contract after not paying the salaries of Dávila and Luis Swisher.

International career
He made his debut for Guatemala in a July 2004 friendly match against El Salvador and has, as of May 2010, earned a total of 26 caps, scoring 1 goal. He has represented his country in 8 FIFA World Cup qualification matches and played at the 2005 UNCAF Nations Cup and the 2005 CONCACAF Gold Cup

His was recalled to the national team in June 2009 after a 4-year absence and played against Mexico and Canada.

International goals
Scores and results list. Guatemala's goal tally first.

References

External links

1982 births
Living people
Sportspeople from Guatemala City
Guatemalan footballers
Guatemala international footballers
2005 UNCAF Nations Cup players
2005 CONCACAF Gold Cup players
Aurora F.C. players
Comunicaciones F.C. players
C.D. Suchitepéquez players
Association football midfielders